This is a list of the bird species recorded in Guadeloupe.  Guadeloupe is an overseas department of France located in the Leeward Islands, part of the Lesser Antilles in the Caribbean. The avifauna of Guadeloupe included a total of 293 species according to Bird Checklists of the World as of July 2022. Of them, one is endemic, 11 have been introduced by humans, and 158 are rare or accidental. Two species have been extirpated and another possibly has been.

This list is presented in the taxonomic sequence of the Check-list of North and Middle American Birds, 7th edition through the 63rd Supplement, published by the American Ornithological Society (AOS). Common and scientific names are also those of the Check-list, except that the common names of families are from the Clements taxonomy because the AOS list does not include them. French names in parentheses are also from the Check-list.

The following tags have been used to highlight several categories. The tags and notes on population status are also from Bird Checklists of the World.

 (A) Accidental - a species that rarely or accidentally occurs in Guadeloupe
 (I) Introduced - a species introduced directly to Guadeloupe or elsewhere in the New World
 (EXT) Extinct - a species which no longer exists
 (EXP) Extirpated - a species that no longer occurs in Guadeloupe although populations exist elsewhere

Ducks, geese, and waterfowl
Order: AnseriformesFamily: Anatidae

Anatidae includes the ducks and most duck-like waterfowl, such as geese and swans. These birds are adapted to an aquatic existence with webbed feet, flattened bills, and feathers that are excellent at shedding water due to an oily coating.

White-faced whistling-duck, Dendrocygna viduata (A)  
Black-bellied whistling-duck, Dendrocygna autumnalis (A)  
West Indian whistling-duck, Dendrocygna arborea (A) (Vulnerable)
Fulvous whistling-duck, Dendrocygna bicolor (A)
Snow goose, Anser caerulescens (A)
Wood duck, Aix sponsa (A)  
Garganey, Spatula querquedula (A)
Blue-winged teal, Anas discors
Northern shoveler, Anas clypeata (A)
Gadwall, Mareca strepera (A)
Eurasian wigeon, Mareca penelope (A)  
American wigeon, Mareca americana (A)
Mallard, Anas platyrhynchos (A)  
American black duck, Anas rubripes (A)
White-cheeked pintail, Anas bahamensis (A)
Northern pintail, Anas acuta (A)
Green-winged teal, Anas crecca (A)
Ring-necked duck, Aythya collaris 
Tufted duck, Aythya fuligula (A)
Lesser scaup, Aythya affinis
Hooded merganser, Lophodytes cucullatus (A)  
Masked duck, Nomonyx dominicus  
Ruddy duck, Oxyura jamaicensis

Pheasants, grouse, and allies
Order: GalliformesFamily: Phasianidae

The Phasianidae are a family of terrestrial birds which consists of quails, partridges, snowcocks, francolins, spurfowls, tragopans, monals, pheasants, peafowls, and jungle fowls. In general, they are plump (although they vary in size) and have broad, relatively short wings.

Red junglefowl, Gallus gallus (I)

Flamingos
Order: PhoenicopteriformesFamily: Phoenicopteridae

Flamingos filter-feed on shellfish and algae. Their oddly shaped beaks are specially adapted to separate mud and silt from the food they consume and, uniquely, are used upside down.

American flamingo, Phoenicopterus ruber (A)

Grebes
Order: PodicipediformesFamily: Podicipedidae

Grebes are small to medium-large freshwater diving birds. They have lobed toes and are excellent swimmers and divers. However, they have their feet placed far back on the body, making them quite ungainly on land.

Pied-billed grebe, Podilymbus podiceps

Pigeons and doves
Order: ColumbiformesFamily: Columbidae

Pigeons and doves are stout-bodied birds with short necks and short slender bills with a fleshy cere.

Rock pigeon, Columba livia (I)
Scaly-naped pigeon, Patagioenas squamosa
White-crowned pigeon, Patagioenas leucocephala (Near-threatened)
Eurasian collared-dove, Streptopelia decaocto (I)
Common ground dove, Columbina passerina
Ruddy quail-dove, Geotrygon montana
Bridled quail-dove, Geotrygon mystacea
White-winged dove, Zenaida asiatica
Zenaida dove, Zenaida aurita
Eared dove, Zenaida auriculata (A)
Mourning dove, Zenaida macroura (A)

Cuckoos
Order: CuculiformesFamily: Cuculidae

The family Cuculidae includes cuckoos, roadrunners, and anis. These birds are of variable size with slender bodies, long tails, and strong legs. The Old World cuckoos are brood parasites.

Smooth-billed ani, Crotophaga ani
Common cuckoo, Cuculus canorus (A)
Yellow-billed cuckoo, Coccyzus americanus
Mangrove cuckoo, Coccyzus minor
Black-billed cuckoo, Coccyzus erythropthalmus (A)

Nightjars and allies
Order: CaprimulgiformesFamily: Caprimulgidae

Nightjars are medium-sized nocturnal birds that usually nest on the ground. They have long wings, short legs, and very short bills. Most have small feet, of little use for walking, and long pointed wings. Their soft plumage is camouflaged to resemble bark or leaves.

Common nighthawk,  Chordeiles minor (A)
Antillean nighthawk, Chordeiles gundlachii (A)
Chuck-will's-widow, Antrostomus carolinensis (A)

Swifts
Order: ApodiformesFamily: Apodidae

Swifts are small birds which spend the majority of their lives flying. These birds have very short legs and never settle voluntarily on the ground, perching instead only on vertical surfaces. Many swifts have long swept-back wings which resemble a crescent or boomerang.

Black swift, Cypseloides niger
White-collared swift, Streptoprocne zonaris (A)
Lesser Antillean swift, Chaetura martinica
Chimney swift, Chaetura pelagica (A)(Near-threatened)
Short-tailed swift, Chaetura brachyura (A)  
Alpine swift, Apus melba (A)

Hummingbirds
Order: ApodiformesFamily: Trochilidae

Hummingbirds are small birds capable of hovering in mid-air due to the rapid flapping of their wings. They are the only birds that can fly backwards.

Purple-throated carib, Eulampis jugularis
Green-throated carib, Eulampis holosericeus
Antillean crested hummingbird, Orthorhyncus cristatus

Rails, gallinules, and coots
Order: GruiformesFamily: Rallidae

Rallidae is a large family of small to medium-sized birds which includes the rails, crakes, coots, and gallinules. Typically they inhabit dense vegetation in damp environments near lakes, swamps, or rivers. In general they are shy and secretive birds, making them difficult to observe. Most species have strong legs and long toes which are well adapted to soft uneven surfaces. They tend to have short, rounded wings and to be weak fliers.

Clapper rail, Rallus crepitans
Corn crake, Crex crex (A)  
Sora, Porzana carolina
Spotted crake, Porzana porzana (A)
Common gallinule, Gallinula galeata
American coot, Fulica americana
Purple gallinule, Porphyrio martinica
Azure gallinule, Porphyrio flavirostris (A)

Limpkin
Order: GruiformesFamily: Aramidae

The limpkin resembles a large rail. It has drab-brown plumage and a grayer head and neck.

Limpkin, Aramus guarauna (A)

Stilts and avocets
Order: CharadriiformesFamily:

Recurvirostridae is a family of large wading birds which includes the avocets and stilts. The avocets have long legs and long up-curved bills. The stilts have extremely long legs and long, thin, straight bills.

Black-winged stilt, Himantopus himantopus (A)
Black-necked stilt, Himantopus mexicanus (A)

Oystercatchers
Order: CharadriiformesFamily: Haematopodidae

The oystercatchers are large and noisy plover-like birds, with strong bills used for smashing or prising open molluscs.

American oystercatcher, Haematopus palliatus

Plovers and lapwings
Order: CharadriiformesFamily: Charadriidae

The family Charadriidae includes the plovers, dotterels, and lapwings. They are small to medium-sized birds with compact bodies, short thick necks, and long, usually pointed, wings. They are found in open country worldwide, mostly in habitats near water.

Black-bellied plover, Pluvialis squatarola
American golden-plover, Pluvialis dominica
Pacific golden-plover, Pluvialis fulva (A)
Killdeer, Charadrius vociferus (A)
Common ringed plover, Charadrius hiaticula (A)
Semipalmated plover, Charadrius semipalmatus
Piping plover, Charadrius melodus (A) (Near-threatened)
Wilson's plover, Charadrius wilsonia
Collared plover, Charadrius collaris (A)
Snowy plover, Charadrius nivosus (A) (Near-threatened)

Sandpipers and allies
Order: CharadriiformesFamily: Scolopacidae

Scolopacidae is a large diverse family of small to medium-sized shorebirds including the sandpipers, curlews, godwits, shanks, tattlers, woodcocks, snipes, dowitchers, and phalaropes. The majority of these species eat small invertebrates picked out of the mud or soil. Variation in length of legs and bills enables multiple species to feed in the same habitat, particularly on the coast, without direct competition for food.

Upland sandpiper, Bartramia longicauda
Whimbrel, Numenius phaeopus (A)
Eskimo curlew, Numenius borealis (A) (Critically endangered, possibly extinct)
Long-billed curlew, Numenius americanus (A)
Hudsonian godwit, Limosa haemastica (A)
Marbled godwit, Limosa fedoa (A)
Ruddy turnstone, Arenaria interpres
Red knot, Calidris canutus (Near-threatened)
Ruff, Calidris pugnax (A)
Stilt sandpiper, Calidris himantopus
Curlew sandpiper, Calidris ferruginea (A)(Near-threatened)
Sanderling, Calidris alba
Dunlin, Calidris alpina (A)
Baird's sandpiper, Calidris bairdii (A)
Least sandpiper, Calidris minutilla
White-rumped sandpiper, Calidris fuscicollis
Buff-breasted sandpiper, Calidris subruficollis (A)(Near-threatened)
Pectoral sandpiper, Calidris melanotos
Semipalmated sandpiper, Calidris pusilla (Near-threatened)
Western sandpiper, Calidris mauri
Short-billed dowitcher, Limnodromus griseus
Long-billed dowitcher, Limnodromus scolopaceus (A)
Wilson's snipe, Gallinago delicata
Spotted sandpiper, Actitis macularia
Green sandpiper, Tringa ochropus (A)
Solitary sandpiper, Tringa solitaria
Lesser yellowlegs, Tringa flavipes
Willet, Tringa semipalmata
Spotted redshank, Tringa erythropus (A)
Greater yellowlegs, Tringa melanoleuca
Common redshank, Tringa totanus (A) 
Wood sandpiper, Tringa glareola (A)
Wilson's phalarope, Phalaropus tricolor (A)
Red-necked phalarope, Phalaropus lobatus (A)
Red phalarope, Phalaropus fulicarius (A)

Pratincoles
Order: CharadriiformesFamily: Glareolidae

Glareolidae is a family of wading birds comprising the pratincoles, which have short legs, long pointed wings and long forked tails, and the coursers, which have long legs, short wings and long, pointed bills which curve downwards.

Collared pratincole, Glareola pratincola (A)

Skuas and jaegers
Order: CharadriiformesFamily: Stercorariidae

The family Stercorariidae are, in general, medium to large birds, typically with gray or brown plumage, often with white markings on the wings. They nest on the ground in temperate and arctic regions and are long-distance migrants.

Great skua, Stercorarius skua (A)
South polar skua, Stercorarius maccormicki (A)
Pomarine jaeger, Stercorarius pomarinus
Parasitic jaeger, Stercorarius parasiticus
Long-tailed jaeger, Stercorarius longicaudus (A)

Gulls, terns, and skimmers
Order: CharadriiformesFamily: Laridae

Laridae is a family of medium to large seabirds and includes gulls, kittiwakes, terns and skimmers. They are typically gray or white, often with black markings on the head or wings. They have longish bills and webbed feet. Terns are a group of generally medium to large seabirds typically with gray or white plumage, often with black markings on the head. Most terns hunt fish by diving but some pick insects off the surface of fresh water. Terns are generally long-lived birds, with several species known to live in excess of 30 years. Skimmers are a small family of tropical tern-like birds. They have an elongated lower mandible which they use to feed by flying low over the water surface and skimming the water for small fish.

Black-legged kittiwake, Rissa tridactyla (A)
Bonaparte's gull, Chroicocephalus philadelphia (A)
Black-headed gull, Chroicocephalus ridibundus (A)
Laughing gull, Leucophaeus atricilla
Franklin's gull, Leucophaeus pipixcan (A)
Ring-billed gull, Larus delawarensis
Herring gull, Larus argentatus (A)
Iceland gull, Larus glaucoides (A)
Lesser black-backed gull, Larus fuscus
Great black-backed gull, Larus marinus (A)
Brown noddy, Anous stolidus
Sooty tern, Onychoprion fuscatus
Bridled tern, Onychoprion anaethetus
Least tern, Sternula antillarum
Gull-billed tern, Gelochelidon nilotica (A)
Caspian tern, Hydroprogne caspia (A)
Black tern, Chlidonias niger (A)
White-winged tern, Chlidonias leucopterus (A)
Roseate tern, Sterna dougallii
Common tern, Sterna hirundo
Arctic tern, Sterna paradisaea (A)
Forster's tern, Sterna forsteri (A)
Royal tern, Thalasseus maximus
Sandwich tern, Thalasseus sandvicensis (A)

Tropicbirds
Order: PhaethontiformesFamily: Phaethontidae

Tropicbirds are slender white birds of tropical oceans with exceptionally long central tail feathers. Their heads and long wings have black markings.

White-tailed tropicbird, Phaethon lepturus
Red-billed tropicbird, Phaethon aethereus

Albatrosses
Order: ProcellariiformesFamily: Diomedeidae

The albatrosses are among the largest of flying birds, and the great albatrosses from the genus Diomedea have the largest wingspans of any extant birds.

Yellow-nosed albatross, Thalassarche chlororhynchos (A)

Southern storm-petrels
Order: ProcellariiformesFamily: Oceanitidae

The storm-petrels are the smallest seabirds, relatives of the petrels, feeding on planktonic crustaceans and small fish picked from the surface, typically while hovering. The flight is fluttering and sometimes bat-like. Until 2018, this family's species were included with the other storm-petrels in family Hydrobatidae.

Wilson's storm-petrel, Oceanites oceanicus

Northern storm-petrels
Order: ProcellariiformesFamily: Hydrobatidae

Though the members of this family are similar in many respects to the southern storm-petrels, including their general appearance and habits, there are enough genetic differences to warrant their placement in a separate family.

Leach's storm-petrel, Hydrobates leucorhous

Shearwaters and petrels
Order: ProcellariiformesFamily: Procellariidae

The procellariids are the main group of medium-sized "true petrels", characterised by united nostrils with medium septum and a long outer functional primary.

Trindade petrel, Pterodroma arminjoniana (A) (Vulnerable)
Black-capped petrel, Pterodroma hasitata (A) 
Bulwer's petrel, Bulweria bulwerii (A)  
Cory's shearwater, Calonectris diomedea 
Cape Verde shearwater, Calonectris edwardsii (A) (Near-threatened)
Sooty shearwater, Ardenna grisea (Near-threatened)
Great shearwater, Ardenna gravis  
Manx shearwater, Puffinus puffinus  
Audubon's shearwater, Puffinus lherminieri
Barolo shearwater, Puffinus baroli (A)

Frigatebirds
Order: SuliformesFamily: Fregatidae

Frigatebirds are large seabirds usually found over tropical oceans. They are large, black-and-white, or completely black, with long wings and deeply forked tails. The males have colored inflatable throat pouches. They do not swim or walk and cannot take off from a flat surface. Having the largest wingspan-to-body-weight ratio of any bird, they are essentially aerial, able to stay aloft for more than a week.

Magnificent frigatebird, Fregata magnificens

Boobies and gannets
Order: SuliformesFamily: Sulidae

The sulids comprise the gannets and boobies. Both groups are medium to large coastal seabirds that plunge-dive for fish.

Masked booby, Sula dactylatra (A)
Brown booby, Sula leucogaster
Red-footed booby, Sula sula
Northern gannet, Morus bassanus (A)

Cormorants and shags
Order: SuliformesFamily: Phalacrocoracidae

Phalacrocoracidae is a family of medium to large coastal, fish-eating seabirds that includes cormorants and shags. Plumage coloration varies, with the majority having mainly dark plumage, some species being black-and-white, and a few being colorful.

Double-crested cormorant, Nannopterum auritum (A)

Pelicans
Order: PelecaniformesFamily: Pelecanidae

Pelicans are large water birds with a distinctive pouch under their beak. As with other members of the order Pelecaniformes, they have webbed feet with four toes.

Brown pelican, Pelecanus occidentalis

Herons, egrets, and bitterns
Order: PelecaniformesFamily: Ardeidae

The family Ardeidae contains the bitterns, herons, and egrets. Herons and egrets are medium to large wading birds with long necks and legs. Bitterns tend to be shorter necked and more wary. Members of Ardeidae fly with their necks retracted, unlike other long-necked birds such as storks, ibises, and spoonbills.

American bittern, Botaurus lentiginosus (A)
Least bittern, Ixobrychus exilis
Great blue heron, Ardea herodias
Gray heron, Ardea cinerea (A)
Great egret, Ardea alba
Little egret, Egretta garzetta (A) 
Snowy egret, Egretta thula
Little blue heron, Egretta caerulea
Tricolored heron, Egretta tricolor (A)
Cattle egret, Bubulcus ibis
Squacco heron, Ardeola ralloides (A)
Green heron, Butorides virescens
Striated heron, Butorides striata (A)
Black-crowned night-heron, Nycticorax nycticorax (A)
Yellow-crowned night-heron, Nyctanassa violacea

Ibises and spoonbills
Order: PelecaniformesFamily: Threskiornithidae

Threskiornithidae is a family of large terrestrial and wading birds which includes the ibises and spoonbills. They have long, broad wings with 11 primary and about 20 secondary feathers. They are strong fliers and despite their size and weight, very capable soarers.

Glossy ibis, Plegadis falcinellus (A)
Roseate spoonbill, Ajaia ajaja (A)

Osprey
Order: AccipitriformesFamily: Pandionidae

The family Pandionidae contains only one species, the osprey. The osprey is a medium-large raptor which is a specialist fish-eater with a worldwide distribution.

Osprey, Pandion haliaetus (A)

Hawks, eagles, and kites
Order: AccipitriformesFamily: Accipitridae

Accipitridae is a family of birds of prey which includes hawks, eagles, kites, harriers, and Old World vultures. These birds have powerful hooked beaks for tearing flesh from their prey, strong legs, powerful talons, and keen eyesight.

Swallow-tailed kite, Elanoides forficatus (A)  
Northern harrier, Circus hudsonius (A)
Western marsh-harrier, Circus aeruginosus (A)  
Black kite, Milvus migrans (A)  
Broad-winged hawk, Buteo platypterus (A)
Red-tailed hawk, Buteo jamaicensis (A)

Barn-owls
Order: StrigiformesFamily: Tytonidae

Barn-owls are medium to large owls with large heads and characteristic heart-shaped faces. They have long strong legs with powerful talons.

Barn owl, Tyto alba (A)

Owls
Order: StrigiformesFamily: Strigidae

The typical owls are small to large solitary nocturnal birds of prey. They have large forward-facing eyes and ears, a hawk-like beak, and a conspicuous circle of feathers around each eye called a facial disk.

Burrowing owl, Athene cunicularia (EXP)

Kingfishers
Order: CoraciiformesFamily: Alcedinidae

Water kingfishers are medium-sized birds with large heads, long, pointed bills, short legs, and stubby tails.

Ringed kingfisher, Megaceryle torquata
Belted kingfisher, Megaceryle alcyon

Woodpeckers
Order: PiciformesFamily: Picidae

Woodpeckers are small to medium-sized birds with chisel-like beaks, short legs, stiff tails, and long tongues used for capturing insects. Some species have feet with two toes pointing forward and two backward, while several species have only three toes. Many woodpeckers have the habit of tapping noisily on tree trunks with their beaks.

Guadeloupe woodpecker, Melanerpes herminieri (Endemic)
Yellow-bellied sapsucker, Sphyrapicus varius (A)

Falcons and caracaras
Order: FalconiformesFamily: Falconidae

Falconidae is a family of diurnal birds of prey. They differ from hawks, eagles, and kites in that they kill with their beaks instead of their talons.

Eurasian kestrel, Falco tinnunculus (A)
American kestrel, Falco sparverius
Merlin, Falco columbarius
Peregrine falcon, Falco peregrinus

New World and African parrots
Order: PsittaciformesFamily: Psittacidae

Parrots are small to large birds with a characteristic curved beak. Their upper mandibles have slight mobility in the joint with the skull and they have a generally erect stance. All parrots are zygodactyl, having the four toes on each foot placed two at the front and two to the back.

Guadeloupe parrot, Amazona violacea (E) (EXT)
Guadeloupe parakeet, Psittacara labati (E) (EXT)

Tyrant flycatchers
Order: PasseriformesFamily: Tyrannidae

Tyrant flycatchers are passerine birds which occur throughout North and South America. They superficially resemble the Old World flycatchers, but are more robust and have stronger bills. They do not have the sophisticated vocal capabilities of the songbirds. Most, but not all, have plain coloring. As the name implies, most are insectivorous.

Caribbean elaenia, Elaenia martinica
Lesser Antillean flycatcher, Myiarchus oberi
Gray kingbird, Tyrannus dominicensis
Fork-tailed flycatcher, Tyrannus savana (A)
Eastern wood-pewee, Contopus virens (A)
Lesser Antillean pewee, Contopus latirostris

Vireos, shrike-babblers, and erpornis
Order: PasseriformesFamily: Vireonidae

The vireos are a group of small to medium-sized passerine birds. They are typically greenish in color and resemble New World warblers apart from their heavier bills.

White-eyed vireo, Vireo griseus (A)
Yellow-throated vireo, Vireo flavifrons (A)
Philadelphia vireo, Vireo philadelphicus (A)
Red-eyed vireo, Vireo olivaceus
Yellow-green vireo, Vireo flavoviridis (A)
Black-whiskered vireo, Vireo altiloquus

Swallows
Order: PasseriformesFamily: Hirundinidae

The family Hirundinidae is adapted to aerial feeding. They have a slender streamlined body, long pointed wings, and a short bill with a wide gape. The feet are adapted to perching rather than walking, and the front toes are partially joined at the base.

Bank swallow, Riparia riparia
Tree swallow, Tachycineta bicolor (A)
Northern rough-winged swallow, Stelgidopteryx serripennis (A)
Purple martin, Progne subis (A)
Cuban martin, Progne cryptoleuca (A)
Caribbean martin, Progne dominicensis
Barn swallow, Hirundo rustica
Common house-martin, Delichon urbica (A)
Cliff swallow, Petrochelidon pyrrhonota
Cave swallow, Petrochelidon fulva (A)

Waxwings
Order: PasseriformesFamily: Bombycillidae

The waxwings are a group of passerine birds with soft silky plumage and unique red tips to some of the wing feathers. In the Bohemian and cedar waxwings, these tips look like sealing wax and give the group its name. These are arboreal birds of northern forests. They live on insects in summer and berries in winter.

Cedar waxwing, Bombycilla cedrorum (A)

Wrens
Order: PasseriformesFamily: Troglodytidae

The wrens are mainly small and inconspicuous except for their loud songs. These birds have short wings and thin down-turned bills. Several species often hold their tails upright. All are insectivorous.

House wren, Troglodytes aedon (EXP)

Mockingbirds and thrashers
Order: PasseriformesFamily: Mimidae

The mimids are a family of passerine birds that includes thrashers, mockingbirds, tremblers, and the New World catbirds. These birds are notable for their vocalizations, especially their ability to mimic a wide variety of birds and other sounds heard outdoors. Their coloring tends towards dull-grays and browns.

Gray catbird, Dumetella carolinensis (A)
Scaly-breasted thrasher, Allenia fusca
Pearly-eyed thrasher, Margarops fuscatus
Brown trembler, Cinclocerthia ruficauda
Tropical mockingbird, Mimus gilvus

Thrushes and allies
Order: PasseriformesFamily: Turdidae

The thrushes are a group of passerine birds that occur mainly in the Old World. They are plump, soft-plumaged, small to medium-sized insectivores or sometimes omnivores, often feeding on the ground. Many have attractive songs.

Gray-cheeked thrush, Catharus minimus (A)
Swainson's thrush, Catharus ustulatus (A)
Spectacled thrush, Turdus nudigenis
Forest thrush, Turdus lherminieri (near-threatened)

Old World flycatchers
Order: PasseriformesFamily: Muscicapidae

Old World flycatchers are a large group of small passerine birds native to the Old World. They are mainly small arboreal insectivores. The appearance of these birds is highly varied, but they mostly have weak songs and harsh calls.

Northern wheatear, Oenanthe oenanthe (A)

Weavers and allies
Order: PasseriformesFamily: Ploceidae

The weavers are small passerine birds related to the finches. They are seed-eating birds with rounded conical bills. The males of many species are brightly colored, usually in red or yellow and black, some species show variation in color only in the breeding season.

Northern red bishop, Euplectes franciscanus (I)
Yellow-crowned bishop, Euplectes afer (I)

Waxbills and allies
Order: PasseriformesFamily: Estrildidae

The estrildid finches are small passerine birds of the Old World tropics and Australasia. They are gregarious and often colonial seed eaters with short thick but pointed bills. They are all similar in build and habits, but have wide variation in plumage colors and patterns.

Orange-cheeked waxbill, Estrilda melpoda (I)  
Black-rumped waxbill, Estrilda troglodytes (I) 
Red avadavat, Amandava amandava (I)
White-headed munia, Lonchura maja (I)
Scaly-breasted munia, Lonchura punctulata (I)

Old World sparrows
Order: PasseriformesFamily: Passeridae

Sparrows are small passerine birds. In general, sparrows tend to be small, plump, brown or gray birds with short tails and short powerful beaks. Sparrows are seed eaters, but they also consume small insects.

House sparrow, Passer domesticus (I)

Finches, euphonias, and allies
Order: PasseriformesFamily: Fringillidae

Finches are seed-eating passerine birds that are small to moderately large and have a strong beak, usually conical and in some species very large. All have twelve tail feathers and nine primaries. These birds have a bouncing flight with alternating bouts of flapping and gliding on closed wings, and most sing well.

Antillean euphonia, Chlorophonia musica

Troupials and allies
Order: PasseriformesFamily: Icteridae

The icterids are a group of small to medium-sized, often colorful, passerine birds restricted to the New World and include the grackles, New World blackbirds, and New World orioles. Most species have black as the predominant plumage color, often enlivened by yellow, orange, or red.

Bobolink, Dolichonyx oryzivorus
Orchard oriole, Icterus spurius (A)
Baltimore oriole, Icterus galbula (A)
Shiny cowbird, Molothrus bonariensis (A)
Carib grackle, Quiscalus lugubris

New World warblers
Order: PasseriformesFamily: Parulidae

The New World warblers are a group of small, often colorful, passerine birds restricted to the New World. Most are arboreal, but some are terrestrial. Most members of this family are insectivores.

Ovenbird, Seiurus aurocapilla
Worm-eating warbler, Helmitheros vermivorum (A)
Louisiana waterthrush, Parkesia motacilla (A)
Northern waterthrush, Parkesia noveboracensis
Blue-winged warbler, Vermivora cyanoptera (A)
Black-and-white warbler, Mniotilta varia
Prothonotary warbler, Protonotaria citrea
Tennessee warbler, Leiothlypis peregrina (A)
Nashville warbler, Leiothlypis ruficapilla (A)
Connecticut warbler, Oporornis agilis (A)
Kentucky warbler, Geothlypis formosa (A)
Common yellowthroat, Geothlypis trichas (A)
Plumbeous warbler, Setophaga plumbea
Hooded warbler, Setophaga citrina (A)
American redstart, Setophaga ruticilla
Cape May warbler, Setophaga tigrina (A)
Cerulean warbler, Setophaga cerulea (A)(near-threatened)
Northern parula, Setophaga americana
Magnolia warbler, Setophaga magnolia (A)
Bay-breasted warbler, Setophaga castanea (A)
Blackburnian warbler, Setophaga fusca (A)
Yellow warbler, Setophaga petechia
Chestnut-sided warbler, Setophaga pensylvanica (A)
Blackpoll warbler, Setophaga striata
Black-throated blue warbler, Setophaga caerulescens (A)
Palm warbler, Setophaga palmarum (A)
Pine warbler, Setophaga pinus (A)
Yellow-rumped warbler, Setophaga coronata (A)
Yellow-throated warbler, Setophaga dominica (A)
Prairie warbler, Setophaga discolor
Black-throated green warbler, Setophaga virens (A)
Canada warbler, Cardellina canadensis (A)

Cardinals and allies
Order: PasseriformesFamily: Cardinalidae

The cardinals are a family of robust, seed-eating birds with strong bills. They are typically associated with open woodland. The sexes usually have distinct plumages.

Summer tanager, Piranga rubra (A)
Scarlet tanager, Piranga olivacea (A)
Rose-breasted grosbeak, Pheucticus ludovicianus (A)
Blue grosbeak, Passerina caerulea (A)
Indigo bunting, Passerina cyanea (A)
Dickcissel, Spiza americana (A)

Tanagers and allies
Order: PasseriformesFamily: Thraupidae

The tanagers are a large group of small to medium-sized passerine birds restricted to the New World, mainly in the tropics. Many species are brightly colored. As a family they are omnivorous, but individual species specialize in eating fruits, seeds, insects, or other types of food. Most have short, rounded wings.

Grassland yellow-finch, Sicalis luteola (I)  
Bananaquit, Coereba flaveola
Lesser Antillean bullfinch, Loxigilla noctis  
Black-faced grassquit, Melanospiza bicolor
Lined seedeater, Sporophila lineola (A)
Lesser Antillean saltator, Saltator albicollis

Notes

References

See also
List of birds
Lists of birds by region

Guadeloupe
'